Millcreek Township is a township in Erie County, Pennsylvania. The population was 54,073 at the 2020 census. It is the 12th largest municipality in the state.

Millcreek Township is home to the entrance to Presque Isle State Park, Waldameer Park, Millcreek Mall, and other attractions. Also located in the township is Erie International Airport, the primary airport serving the Erie metropolitan area. LECOM Health, a non-profit healthcare system serving Erie County and the surrounding areas, also calls the township home.

History

Evidence exists of Native American presence in Millcreek Township as early as 3700 BC. The township's Sommerheim Park is the location of the Sommerheim Park Archaeological District, which has yielded archaeological artifacts from the Archaic and Woodland periods.

One of the earliest townships in the Erie Triangle to be settled, Millcreek was one of the original 16 townships of Erie County. As families came they moved from the bayfront settlement of Erie and began to form small hamlets such as Federal Hill, Kearsarge, Marvintown, and Weigelville, all to become part of Mill Creek Township. As the Erie settlement grew, first into a borough, then a city, it annexed more and more sections of the township.

19th century

After the east–west roads were laid out, taverns began to sprout about every mile or so. Along the Ridge Road (U.S. Route 20), which was laid west through Millcreek in 1805, one of the few that remain is the Nicholson Tavern. Built in 1836, mostly by Isabella Nicholson and her sons, it is still owned by the family and is listed on the National Register of Historic Places. The Presque Isle Light and Sommerheim Park Archaeological District are also listed.

A recurving sandspit peninsula, Presque Isle, connects to the mainland in western Millcreek. During the War of 1812, Oliver Hazard Perry commanded his fleet in battle and strategically used the peninsula's bay as a harbor to construct six out of nine of the ships in his fleet. In 1921, the peninsula was made a state park and was designated a National Natural Landmark by the National Park Service. Today, the park is a bird sanctuary with over 150 different species identified here.

Just west of the entry into Presque Isle was a well-forested area known as Hopkins Grove. The Erie Electric Motor Company purchased the grove in 1896 for development into an amusement park. Waldameer Park is one of the oldest amusement parks in the nation.

Geography

Today, land use in Millcreek is dedicated to retail, commercial and service-oriented businesses, to light industry, public and private schools, and residential areas. About 1% of the land is still zoned for agriculture. Located within its borders is Edinboro University's Porreco College, Zuck Park, the Erie Golf Course, and the Asbury Woods Nature Center and Recreation Center.

Demographics

At the 2000 census, there were 52,129 people, 21,217 households, and 14,088 families living in the township.  The population density was 1,768.5 people per square mile (682.7/km).  There were 22,369 housing units at an average density of 758.9/sq mi (293.0/km).  The racial makeup of the township was 96.55% White, 1.09% African American, 0.09% Native American, 1.34% Asian, 0.01% Pacific Islander, 0.30% from other races, and 0.62% from two or more races. Hispanic or Latino of any race were 0.99%.

There were 21,217 households, 30.2% had children under the age of 18 living with them, 55.0% were married couples living together, 8.4% had a female householder with no husband present, and 33.6% were non-families. 29.0% of households were made up of individuals, and 11.7% were one person aged 65 or older.  The average household size was 2.42 and the average family size was 3.01.

The age distribution was 24.1% under the age of 18, 7.2% from 18 to 24, 27.4% from 25 to 44, 25.2% from 45 to 64, and 16.1% 65 or older.  The median age was 40 years. For every 100 females, there were 93.2 males.  For every 100 females age 18 and over, there were 89.6 males.

The median household income was $45,019 and the median family income was $56,341. Males had a median income of $41,868 versus $26,610 for females. The per capita income for the township was $24,279.  About 3.9% of families and 5.8% of the population were below the poverty line, including 7.0% of those under age 18 and 4.8% of those age 65 or over.

Education
Millcreek Township is served by the Millcreek Township School District.

Elementary Schools
 Asbury Elementary School
 Belle Valley Elementary School
 Chestnut Hill Elementary
 Grandview Elementary
 Tracy Elementary School

Middle Schools
 James S. Wilson Middle School
 Walnut Creek Middle School
 Westlake Middle School

High Schools
 McDowell High School

References

External links

Millcreek Township official website

Townships in Erie County, Pennsylvania
Townships in Pennsylvania
Pennsylvania populated places on Lake Erie